The Professor is a 1919 American silent comedy film made at the Chaplin Studios for the First National film company starring Charlie Chaplin. However, the film was never released or even completed. Chaplin abandoned production after finishing only one sequence: a single reel. Chaplin appears not as his usual Tramp character but as "Professor Bosco", a slovenly showman who brings his flea circus with him when staying at a flophouse. The fleas get loose during the night and create havoc.

The surviving film is included in Unknown Chaplin and on the Criterion Collection Limelight Blu-ray and release.

Cast
 Charlie Chaplin - Professor Bosco
 Albert Austin - Man in flophouse
 Henry Bergman - Bearded man in flophouse
 Loyal Underwood - Flophouse proprietor
 Tom Wilson - Man in flophouse
 Tom Wood - Fat man in flophouse

See also
 List of American films of 1919
 Her Friend the Bandit - a 1914 lost film co-directed by Chaplin and Mabel Normand.

External links

 

1919 films
1919 comedy films
1919 short films
1910s unfinished films
American silent short films
American comedy short films
Short films directed by Charlie Chaplin
American black-and-white films
Silent American comedy films
First National Pictures films
1910s American films